"Non voglio mica la luna" (transl. "I don't really ask for the moon") is a 1984 song composed by  Zucchero Fornaciari, Luigi Albertelli and Enzo Malepasso, arranged by Vince Tempera and performed by Fiordaliso. The song premiered at the 34th edition of the Sanremo Music Festival, where it ranked fifth. It is Fiordaliso's signature song and her main commercial success.

Track listing

   7" single 
 "Non voglio mica la luna"  (Zucchero Fornaciari, Luigi Albertelli, Enzo Malepasso)
 "Un tipo" (Luigi Albertelli, Enzo Malepasso)

Charts

Cover versions
The same year Daniela Romo adapted the lyrics in Spanish and included her version of the song, "Yo No Te Pido La Luna", in her album Amor prohibido; her version was a massive success in Latin America.

References

 

1984 singles
Italian songs
1984 songs
Sanremo Music Festival songs
Songs written by Zucchero Fornaciari